Pramaggiore is a town in the Metropolitan City of Venice, Veneto, Italy. It is north of SR53.

Sources

(Google Maps)

Cities and towns in Veneto